Andrew Teisher Weaver (born February 12, 1959) is a former professional road bicycle racer from the United States, who won the bronze medal in the team time trial at the 1984 Summer Olympics. His winning teammates in Los Angeles, California were Ron Kiefel, Clarence Knickman, and Davis Phinney. Weaver was also a member of the 1979 Pan American Games US team and won a gold medal at the 1983 Pan American Games. He is a nine-time National Cycling Champion.

Andrew Weaver received a bachelor's degree in architecture from the University of Florida and a master's degree in architecture from the Massachusetts Institute of Technology.

Weaver is a practicing architect and established Weaver+Associates Architects in 1994.  He is a Registered Architect in Massachusetts, Rhode Island, Connecticut, New York, New Jersey, New Hampshire and Maine specializing in resort/golf-related projects, private institutional, sports and multi-family projects.

See also
 List of University of Florida alumni
 List of University of Florida Olympians

References

Sources
 
 Architecture Week database

1959 births
Living people
American male cyclists
Architects from Massachusetts
Cyclists at the 1984 Summer Olympics
Olympic bronze medalists for the United States in cycling
University of Florida alumni
Sportspeople from Columbus, Ohio
Medalists at the 1984 Summer Olympics
Pan American Games medalists in cycling
Medalists at the 1979 Pan American Games
Medalists at the 1983 Pan American Games
Pan American Games gold medalists for the United States